The Gradient Bliss is a Czech single-place, paraglider designed and produced by Gradient sro of Prague. Originally produced in the mid-2000, it is no longer in production.

Design and development
The Bliss was designed as an intermediate performance glider. The models are each named for their approximate wing area in square metres.

Variants
Bliss 24
Small-sized model for lighter pilots. The glider model is DHV 2-3 and AFNOR Performance certified.
Bliss 26
Mid-sized model for medium-weight pilots. The glider model is DHV 2-3 and AFNOR Performance certified.
Bliss 28
Large-sized model for heavier pilots. The glider model is DHV 2-3 and AFNOR Performance certified.

Specifications (Bliss 26)

References

External links
photo of a Gradient Bliss

Bliss
Paragliders